Batman: Gotham City Racer is a racing game released in 2001 by Ubisoft for the PlayStation. It is based on The New Batman Adventures and incorporated many clips from the series into the game.

External links 
 

2001 video games
Gotham City Racer
Gotham City Racer
PlayStation (console) games
PlayStation (console)-only games
Racing video games
Ubisoft games
Video games developed in the United States
Superhero video games
Multiplayer and single-player video games
Video games set in the United States